Richard Bradley Sack (October 25, 1935 – April 24, 2017) was an American physician and researcher noted for his contributions to the treatment of cholera.

Early years
Sack was born in Le Sueur, Minnesota to Wilma Mary (Hyink) and Rev. Nobel V. Sack. He grew up in Iowa and graduated from Lewis & Clark College, then attended the University of Oregon School of Medicine where he graduated in 1960.

Career 
He did his residency at the University of Washington, followed by a fellowship with the Johns Hopkins Bloomberg School of Public Health. Sack joined the Johns Hopkins faculty in 1962. Sack's lab first identified Enterotoxigenic Escherichia coli, a bacterium that is a major cause of diarrhea. He established two research centers funded by the NIH, one in Lima, Peru and one in the White Mountain Apache Reservation in Whiteriver, Arizona. He co-authored over 350 peer-reviewed publications.

Family 
He was the brother of Robert L. Sack.

References

1935 births
2017 deaths
Johns Hopkins Bloomberg School of Public Health faculty
Lewis & Clark College alumni
Oregon Health & Science University alumni
People from Le Sueur, Minnesota
People from Lutherville, Maryland